Blackhorse is a stop on the Luas light-rail tram system in Dublin, Ireland.  It opened in 2004 as a stop on the Red Line.  The stop is located at the intersection of Davitt Road and Naas Road.  The stop has two edge platforms, and is of the same design as many Luas stops.  After departing the stop, northbound trams head along a section of track which runs adjacent to the Grand Canal on their way to Connolly or The Point.  Southbound trams turn onto Naas Road, travelling south-west towards Tallaght or Saggart.

The stop lies adjacent to Blackhorse bridge and a pub called The Black Horse.

The stop is also served by Dublin Bus routes 13, 68 and 69.

Proposals
In 2007, a proposal was announced for a Luas line from the city centre to Lucan.  As of 2020, the project has not been officially approved, but under the proposal, the new line would share track with the Red Line between Blackhorse and Fatima.  Blackhorse would therefore become a junction stop, with trams en route to Lucan from the city centre diverging from the red line and continuing along the bank of the royal canal.

Incidents
On 28 June 2012, a 32-year-old woman intending to board a tram at Blackhorse fell onto the tracks as the tram was pulling in and was caught between the tram and the platform.  She was freed, rushed to hospital, and died on 6 July.  As of 2020, she is the only passenger to have been killed in an incident on the Luas.

References

Luas Red Line stops in Dublin (city)